Suphisellus pereirai is a species of burrowing water beetle in the subfamily Noterinae. It was described by Félix Guignot in 1958 and is found in Brazil.

References

Suphisellus
Beetles described in 1958